Wharfedale is a ward in the north east of the City of Bradford Metropolitan District Council in West Yorkshire, England and is situated in Wharfedale (which the ward is named after), one of the Yorkshire Dales. It consists of the settlements of Burley-in-Wharfedale, Burley Woodhead and Menston along with surrounding moorland. The population of the ward taken at the 2011 Census was 11,836.

Councillors 
Wharfedale ward is represented on Bradford Council by three Conservative councillors, Gerald Barker, Jackie Whiteley and Dale Smith.

 indicates seat up for re-election.
 indicates councillor defection.
 indicates a by-election.

References

External links
Wharfedale Forums Wharfedale Ward Discussion Forum
BCSP (Internet Explorer only)
BBC election results
Council ward profile (pdf)
Wharfedale Ward Councillor Matt Palmer

Wards of Bradford
Wharfedale